Persatuan Sepakbola Perusahaan Listrik Negara Nanggroe Aceh Darussalam (simply known as PS PLN NAD) is an Indonesian football club based in Banda Aceh, Aceh. They currently compete in the Liga 3 and their homeground is Harapan Bangsa Stadium.

Players

Current squad

References

External links
PS PLN NAD Instagram

Banda Aceh
Football clubs in Indonesia
 Football clubs in Aceh
Association football clubs established in 2006
2006 establishments in Indonesia